The Bendigo Independent was a newspaper published in Bendigo, Victoria, Australia.

History
The Independent was founded in Bendigo (also named Sandhurst) in or before March 1862. E. A. Banks (1854–1920)  was the editor for many years.

In November 1918 the management of the Independent purchased its competitor The Bendigo Advertiser, and amalgamated the two titles under the banner of the latter.

Digitization
Copies of The Bendigo Independent of most issues from No. 8428 (1 January 1891) to No. 14910 (30 November 1918) have been digitized by the National Library of Australia and may be accessed via Trove.
The newspaper was issued daily (except Sundays) during this period.

References 

Defunct newspapers published in Victoria (Australia)
1862 establishments in Australia
1918 disestablishments in Australia